The Chojun Textile and Quilt Art Museum is a textile museum located in Myeongdong, Seoul, South Korea.

See also
List of museums in Seoul
List of museums in South Korea

External links
Official website

Textile museums
Jung District, Seoul
Art museums and galleries in Seoul
Quilt museums
Art museums established in 1998
1998 establishments in South Korea
Textile arts of Korea